Aemulatrix is a genus of moths belonging to the subfamily Olethreutinae of the family Tortricidae.

Species
Aemulatrix aequilibra Diakonoff, 1982 (from Sri Lanka)
Aemulatrix notognatha Diakonoff, 1988 (from Madagascar)

See also
List of Tortricidae genera

References

External links
tortricidae.com

Tortricidae genera
Olethreutinae